For the a Duchess of Brabant suo jure see Duke of Brabant

The Duchess of Brabant refers to a woman married to the Duke of Brabant or a Duchess of Brabant suo jure.  But this was only as of 1840 when it was revived as an honorific title for the Crown Prince of the newly created Kingdom of Belgium.  There have been only three royal duchesses.

Historically the title went back 657 years before Belgium, and had been always associated with the wives of sovereign Dukes of Brabant, who were alive in their husband's reign.  In the Duchy's 611 years of existence, it only saw three Duchesses who reigned by their own right and three Dukes who rule by the virtue of their wives: Joanna, Mary the Rich, Mary II; and their husbands Wenceslaus of Luxemburg, Maximilian of Austria, Francis of Lorraine.  All these Dukes were reigning monarchs and not consorts.  Also there were the two Co-sovereign of the Spanish Netherlands Isabella and Albert.

Before the elevation to a Duchy, Brabant was a Landgraviate of the Holy Roman Empire. After the death on 20 September 1085 of Hermann II, count palatine of Lotharingia, Henry III of Leuven became landgrave of Brabant, which was an imperial fief between the Dender and the Zenne and his wife, Getrude of Flanders, became Landgravine.  Elevated to a Duchy by Frederick Barbarossa in favor of Henry I.  In 1190, after the death of Godfrey III, Henry I also became Duke of Lotharingia. Formerly Lower Lotharingia, this title was now practically without territorial authority, but was borne by the later Dukes of Brabant as an honorific title. In 1288, the Duchess of Brabant became also Duchess of Limburg. The title fell to the Duchess of Burgundy in 1430. Later on, it followed with the Burgundian inheritance through the Habsburg dynasty until 1794. After the 15th century the title became one of the many appanages associated with the Queen consorts of Spain and later the Holy Roman Empresses.  Queen Sofía of Spain and also the late Crown Princess Regina of Austria also has claims to the title.

Landgravine of Brabant

Duchess of Brabant

House of Leuven, 1183–1406

House of Valois, 1406–1482

House of Habsburg, 1482–1700

House of Bourbon, 1700–1706

House of Habsburg, 1706–1780

House of Habsburg-Lorraine, 1780–1794

Royal Duchesses of Brabant

See also
List of Belgian consorts
Duchess of Limburg
List of Lotharingian consorts
List of Burgundian consorts
List of consorts of Luxembourg
Countess of Flanders
Countess of Hollands

 
Brabant
Duchess
Titles